My Bedbugs is a children's television series created by husband and wife team Alex Greene and Carol Sweeney and produced by GreeneStuff Inc. The series premiered on March 1, 2004, and ended on March 11, 2005.

The 2012 film The Oogieloves in the Big Balloon Adventure is loosely based on the series.

Cast

Voices
Henry Birdseye as J. Edgar
Lee D. as Gooby
Eve Gregson as Toofy
Tonia Sharpe as Woozy
Maryann Sweeney/Gudmundur Thor Karasson as Ruffy the Dogfish

Character actors
Tonia Sharpe and Scott Lauzon as Gooby
Frank Bautista as Toofy
Jaclyn Wells as Woozy

Episodes

Series overview

Season 1 (2004)

Season 2 (2005)

References

External links

2004 American television series debuts
2005 American television series endings
2000s American children's television series
2000s preschool education television series
American preschool education television series
American television shows featuring puppetry
English-language television shows
Local children's television programming in the United States
Television series about insects
Television shows filmed in Michigan